Amir Roustaei ( born August 5, 1997) is an Iranian football forward who currently plays for Iranian club Naft Masjed Soleyman in the Persian Gulf Pro League.

Career statistics

Honours
Persepolis
Persian Gulf Pro League (1): 2019–20

References

See also 

 Amir Roustaei on Instagram

1997 births
Living people
Iranian footballers
Sportspeople from Tehran
Paykan F.C. players
Iran under-20 international footballers
Association football forwards
Footballers at the 2018 Asian Games
Asian Games competitors for Iran
Persepolis F.C. players
Persian Gulf Pro League players